Francois de Massot is a political activist, writer, and journalist. He is the son of the Surrealist writer Pierre de Massot and an associate of Francis Picabia and André Breton. Massot is of French-Scottish extraction and fluent in English. He has worked as a translator, including in the film industry.

Career
Massot joined the Trotskyist movement in France as a young man just after the end of the Second World War. Like other young Trotskyists he was a work-volunteer in Tito's Yugoslavia. De Massot gave an oration at Lambert's funeral.

For most of his life he has been a political activist with the PCI-OCI and its successors. He was, from an early time, responsible for the link between the Lambert group in France and the Healy Group in Britain (later to become the Socialist Labour League), as well as with the American Socialist Workers Party, the main components of the International Committee of the Fourth International (ICFI) from 1953 to 1963. In this capacity he regularly attended conferences of the Socialist Labour League and meetings of the ICFI.

He is the author of a book on the May–June events in France; was a journalist on Informations Ouvrieres, the OCI-PCI newspaper; has been an editor of La Verite, the OCI theoretical journal, and was in charge of the international work of the Organising Committee for the Reconstruction of the Fourth International and its successors. He has been chairman of the CERMTRI archive of Trotskyism in Paris.

Publications
 Quelques Enseignements de Notre Histoire, Francois de Massot, SELIO, Paris
 La Grève générale (mai-juin 1968), suppl. au n° 437 d’Informations ouvrières, Paris

References

Living people
French Trotskyists
Year of birth missing (living people)